Franco Bitossi (born 1 September 1940) is an Italian former professional cyclist. He was born in Camaioni di Carmignano.

Career
Bitossi cycled for three years as an amateur and became a professional in October 1961, after he had reached the required age of 21. As a professional cyclist, from 1961 until 1978, he won a total of 171 races.

In 1965 he won the Tour de Suisse and the Züri-Metzgete, which he won again in 1968. In 1967 he won the Tirreno–Adriatico, Giro di Lombardia and Coppa Agostoni, while the following year he became the first Italian to win the points classification in the Tour de France.

In 1970, he won the Italian championship.

In 1972 he became famous for his near victory at the World Championship in Gap, France, where he was beaten by only a few meters by his teammate Marino Basso.

Four years later, in 1978, he won the Italian Championship again.

Bitossi was nicknamed Cuore matto ("Crazy heart") due to a cardiac arrhythmia which often compelled him to stop midway in a stage.

Major results

1964 
 2nd Giro di Romagna
 3rd Coppa Sabatini
 10th Overall Giro d'Italia
1st  Mountains classification
1st Stages 3, 16, 17 & 20
1965
 1st  Overall Tour de Suisse
1st Stage 2 & 5 
 1st Giro del Lazio
 1st Züri-Metzgete
 3rd Giro dell'Emilia
 3rd Giro della Provincia di Reggio Calabria
 4th Giro di Lombardia
 6th Coppa Sabatini
 7th Giro di Toscana
 7th Overall Giro d'Italia
1st  Mountains classification 
1st Stage 21 
1966
 1st Coppa Sabatini
 Tour de France
1st Stages 5 & 17
 Tour de Romandie
1st Stages 1a (ITT), 1b & 4 
 2nd Giro del Piemonte
 2nd Milano–Vignola
 3rd Coppa Ugo Agostoni
 4th Giro della Romagna
 5th Tre Valli Varesine
 8th Overall Giro d'Italia
1st  Mountains classification
1st Stages 14 & 16 
 10th Overall Tirreno–Adriatico
 10th Giro di Toscana
1967
 1st  Overall Tirreno–Adriatico
1st Stage 1 
 1st Giro di Lombardia
 1st Trofeo Laigueglia
 1st Coppa Ugo Agostoni
 1st Stage 7 Giro d'Italia
 2nd Milano–Torino
 2nd Coppa Sabatini
 2nd Giro dell'Appennino
 3rd Milan–San Remo
 3rd Giro dell'Emilia
 7th Milano–Vignola
 10th Liège–Bastogne–Liège
1968
 1st Milano–Torino
 1st Coppa Bernocchi
 1st Giro di Toscana
 1st Coppa Sabatini
 1st Züri-Metzgete
 1st Stage 7 Giro di Sardegna
 2nd Giro di Lombardia
 2nd Giro di Campania
 4th Overall Tirreno–Adriatico
1st Stage 4
 4th Overall Paris–Luxembourg
 4th Road race, National Road Championships
 4th Road race, UCI Road World Championships
 5th Giro dell'Emilia
 7th Milano–Vignola
 8th Overall Tour de France
1st  Points classification
1st  Combination classification
1st Stages 7 & 16
 9th Overall Giro d'Italia
1st Stages 17 & 21
1969
 1st Coppa Ugo Agostoni
 2nd Volta a Catalunya
1st stages 7 & 8
 2nd Giro dell'Emilia
 3rd Overall À travers Lausanne
 3rd Giro di Lombardia
 3rd Milano–Torino
 3rd Trofeo Laigueglia
 4th Tour of Flanders
 10th Overall Giro d'Italia
1st  Points classification 
1st Stages 11 & 14 
 10th Overall Giro di Sardegna
1970
 1st  Road race, National Road Championships 
 1st  Overall Volta a Catalunya
1st Stage 1a 
 1st Giro di Lombardia
 1st Giro dell'Emilia
 1st Giro del Veneto
 1st Giro di Campania
 1st Stage 2 Tour de Romandie
 2nd Trofeo Masferrer
 2nd Boucles de l'Aulne
 3rd Coppa Placci
 4th Overall À travers Lausanne
1st Stage 1 (ITT)
 5th Overall Tirreno–Adriatico
 5th Critérium des As
 7th Overall Giro d'Italia
1st  Points classification 
1st Stages 1, 3, 17 & 19 
 7th Overall Tour de Suisse
1st Stages 1 & 3 
 7th Coppa Sabatini
 9th Giro della Romagna
 9th Road race, UCI Road World Championships
1971
 1st  Road race, National Road Championships
 1st Coppa Ugo Agostoni
 1st Giro della Romagna
 1st GP Industria & Artigianato di Larciano
 1st Stage 15 Giro d'Italia
 1st Stage 3 Paris–Nice
 1st Stage 1b Tour de Romandie
 2nd Giro di Lombardia
 5th Tre Valli Varesine
 8th Overall Volta a Catalunya
 9th Coppa Placci
 10th Milano–Vignola
1972 
 1st Giro di Puglia
 1st Giro della Provincia di Reggio Calabria
 1st Giro di Campania
 2nd  Road race, UCI Road World Championships
 2nd Road race, National Road Championships
 2nd Milano–Torino
 2nd Giro dell'Appennino
 4th Giro dell'Emilia
 4th Tre Valli Varesine
 6th Coppa Placci
 7th Overall Tour de Romandie
 8th Overall Giro di Sardegna
 8th Züri-Metzgete
 9th Giro di Lombardia
1973 
 1st Giro dell'Emilia
 1st Giro del Veneto
 1st Stage 6 Giro di Sardegna
 2nd Overall Giro di Puglia
 2nd Milano–Torino
 3rd Coppa Sabatini
 3rd Coppa Ugo Agostoni
 4th Tre Valli Varesine
 4th Milano–Vignola
 6th Giro della Romagna
 9th Giro di Lombardia
 9th Trofeo Laigueglia
1974 
 1st Giro della Romagna
 1st Trofeo Matteotti
 2nd Giro del Lazio
 2nd Coppa Ugo Agostoni
 2nd Giro di Toscana
 3rd Coppa Sabatini
 4th Milan–San Remo
 5th Giro di Campania
 7th Overall Tour de Suisse
1st Stages 3a, 3b (ITT), 6 & 9a 
 8th Overall Tirreno–Adriatico
1st Stage 4
 8th Giro di Lombardia
 9th Overall Giro d'Italia
1st Stages 6, 8 & 18 
 10th Giro del Veneto
1975 
 1st Stage 15 Giro d'Italia
 1st Stage 3 Paris–Nice
 La Méditerranéenne
1st Stages 4 & 5 
 2nd Overall Giro di Puglia
1st Stage 1
 2nd Giro di Toscana
 2nd Coppa Placci
 4th Trofeo Laigueglia
 8th Gran Premio Città di Camaiore
1976
 1st  Road race, National Road Championships
 1st Coppa Bernocchi
 1st Giro del Friuli
 1st Trofeo Laigueglia
 1st Stage 2a La Méditerranéenne
 2nd Milano–Torino
 2nd Giro del Lazio
 2nd Giro della Provincia di Reggio Calabria
 4th Coppa Placci
 4th Giro di Campania
 5th Giro di Toscana
 8th Giro di Lombardia
 8th Trofeo Pantalica
 9th Overall Tirreno–Adriatico
 9th Overall Giro di Sardegna
1977
 1st Gran Premio Città di Camaiore
 3rd  Road race, UCI Road World Championships
 3rd Giro di Lombardia
 4th Milano–Torino
 4th Coppa Ugo Agostoni
 6th Overall La Méditerranéenne
 6th Tre Valli Varesine
 6th Gran Premio Industria e Commercio di Prato
 8th Giro dell'Emilia
 9th Trofeo Matteotti
 10th GP Industria & Artigianato di Larciano
1978 
 1st Stage 2 Tirreno–Adriatico
 3rd Milano–Torino
 3rd Coppa Sabatini
 5th Trofeo Pantalica
 9th Giro della Romagna

References

External links

1940 births
Living people
Sportspeople from the Province of Prato
Italian male cyclists
Italian Tour de France stage winners
Italian Giro d'Italia stage winners
Tour de Suisse stage winners
Cyclists from Tuscany
People from Carmignano